Oscar Ljung (6 September 1909 – 29 April 1999) was a Swedish film actor. He appeared in more than 40 films between 1935 and 1983. He was born in Landskrona, Sweden.

Partial filmography

 Järnets män (1935) - Sten Brändström
 The People of Högbogården (1939)- Preacher
 Romans (1940) - Manager at Agrarbolaget (uncredited)
 The Talk of the Town (1941) - Törring, pharmacist
 The Fight Continues (1941) - Allan Hagberg
 Scanian Guerilla (1941) - Per Jensen
 Ride Tonight! (1942) - Ragnar Svedje of Svedjegaarden
 Livet måste levas (1943) - Gustaf Blom
 En fånge har rymt (1943) - Frans Karlsson
 The Old Clock at Ronneberga (1944) - Henrik Heijken
 The Rose of Tistelön (1945) - Kapten Rosenberg
 The Girl from the Marsh Croft (1947) - Per Martinsson
 On These Shoulders (1948) - Andreasson
 Sjösalavår (1949) - Sailor (scenes deleted)
 Realm of Man (1949) - Andreasson
 Skipper in Stormy Weather (1951) - Valter
 Den store gavtyv (1956) - Kalle Karlfeldt
 Synnöve Solbakken (1957) - Guttorm Solbakken
 The Magician (1958) - Antonsson, burly stableman
 The Virgin Spring (1960) - Simon
 Gøngehøvdingen (1961) - Svensk officer
 Vindingevals (1968) - Thelander
 Fanny Hill (1968) - Jan Wilhelmsson
 The New Land (1972) - Petrus Olausson
 Paradise Place (1977) - Arthur
 Sally and Freedom (1981) - Sally's Father

References

External links

1909 births
1999 deaths
People from Landskrona Municipality
Swedish male film actors
20th-century Swedish male actors